Patinoire olympique de Pralognan-la-Vanoise is a 2,300-seat indoor arena located in Pralognan-la-Vanoise, France. The venue hosted the curling competitions for the 1992 Winter Olympics in neighboring Albertville. It was then a demonstration sport.

Post-olympic use
The building is now a recreation center for the resort of Pralognan. Besides the ice rink, it offers an indoor swimming pool, a sauna and a jacuzzi as well as a bowling alley.

References
 1992 Winter Olympics official report.  pp. 110–1. Accessed 5 December 2010. 

Venues of the 1992 Winter Olympics
Olympic curling venues
Indoor arenas in France
Sports venues in Savoie
Curling venues in France